Andreas Høivold (born 1972 in Sunderland, England), is a Norwegian professional poker player. He moved to Oslo in 1974, then moved a year after to Kristiansand where he lived until 2009 when he moved to Las Vegas.

He became famous when he came 3rd in Poker Million V in 2006, despite having turned pro only seven months prior. He since has won an EPT event in Dortmund, for which he won €672,000.

He has cashed 10 times in the World Series of Poker, with total earnings of just over $55,000.

Ladbrokes signed him up after his 3rd-place finish in Poker Million V, but the sponsorship ended in 2009.

He states his poker idols are Phil Ivey, Doyle Brunson, and fellow Scandinavian Gus Hansen, who he says are the players he respects the most.

He also appeared in the opening episodes of High Stakes Poker season six.

As of 2013, his total live tournament winnings exceed $1,700,000.

References

External links
 Profile at europeanpokertour.com
 Profile at 1stSpade.com

Norwegian poker players
European Poker Tour winners
1972 births
Living people